A  is a megathrust earthquake occurring in the Kantō region of Japan that originate from slippage in the Sagami Trough. Kantō earthquakes are thought to occur with a 200-year return period.

Only two earthquakes in the Kantō region are thought to be megathrust earthquakes:
 1923 Great Kantō earthquake; most common usage
 1703 Genroku earthquake

Other earthquakes in the Kantō region, which may or may not be due to slippage in the Sagami Trough:
The Ruijū Kokushi mentions an earthquake that struck the area in 818
 1855 Edo earthquake

See also
South Kantō earthquakes
List of earthquakes in Japan
Nankai megathrust earthquakes
Seismicity of the Sanriku coast
Tōkai earthquakes

Earthquakes in Japan
1923 Great Kantō earthquake